VA-176 has the following meanings:
Attack Squadron 176 (U.S. Navy)
State Route 176 (Virginia)